Kaikala Satyanarayana (25 July 1935 – 23 December 2022) was an Indian actor, producer, director, and politician who predominantly worked in Telugu cinema. He appeared in more than 750 films over eight decades. He was the recipient of the 2011 Raghupathi Venkaiah Award, and 2017 Filmfare Award for lifetime achievement in Telugu cinema. For his acting prowess across a range of roles and genres, he has been given the honorific Navarasa Natana Sarvabhouma.

He served as the Member of Parliament in the 11th Lok Sabha representing Machilipatnam constituency from the Telugu Desam Party.

Early life
Kaikala Satyanarayana was born on 25 July 1935 to Kaikala Laxmi Narayana from Kavutaram village in Krishna district. Having completed his primary education in Gudlavalleru and intermediate education in Vijayawada, Satyanarayana graduated from Gudivada College.

Career
Kaikala was first noticed by D. L. Narayana, who offered him a role in his film Sipayi Koothuru directed by Changayya in 1959. Though it did not do well at the box office, he was noticed for his resemblance to N.T. Rama Rao. They found him as a prospective candidate to play dupe to NTR. Satyanarayana aptly fitted that place. He played dupe to NTR in several movies. NTR offered Satyanarayana a role in his film Apoorva Sahasra Siraccheda Chintamani in 1960, directed by S. D. Lal. Satyanarayana played the role of a prince.

B. Vittalacharya cast him in a negative role in Kanaka Durga Pooja Mahima. He fit the role to the T. From then on, Satyanarayana established himself in villain roles.

Satyanarayana established Rama Films production house and made films such as Kodama Simham (1990), Bangaru Kutumbam (1994), and Muddula Mogudu (1997). He went on to appear in over 750 films.

In 1996, he stepped into politics with TDP winning Lok Sabha elections from Machilipatnam constituency.

In 2012, he served as the jury member for South Region II at the 59th National Film Awards.

Personal life and death
Kaikala married Nageswaramma on 10 April 1960. The couple had two daughters and two sons.

Satyanarayana died on 23 December 2022, at the age of 87.

Awards
Filmfare Awards
 Lifetime Achievement Award (2017)
Nandi Awards
 Best Feature Film – Bangaru Kutumbam (1994)
 Raghupathi Venkaiah Award – 2011

Other honours
 NTR Vignan Trust Award
 Natasekhara, given by Non Government Organization (NGO) in Anantapur and Gudivada Municipal Civic Center

Filmography
As producer

As actor

See also
 Raghupathi Venkaiah Award

References

External links
 

1935 births
2022 deaths
Male actors in Telugu cinema
Indian male film actors
India MPs 1996–1997
Indian actor-politicians
Telugu male actors
People from Krishna district
Telugu Desam Party politicians
Lok Sabha members from Andhra Pradesh
Male actors from Andhra Pradesh
20th-century Indian male actors
Telugu film producers
Telugu film directors
Film directors from Andhra Pradesh
20th-century Indian film directors
Film producers from Andhra Pradesh